The 2600 class were a class of diesel locomotive built by A Goninan & Co, Townsville for Queensland Rail in 1983-1984.

History
The 2600 class entered service on the McNaughton and Newlands lines. They were based at Pring depot near Bowen, and were a standard General Electric export model (similar locomotives were also used in Brazil, Nigeria and Tunisia). Between July 2000 and May 2001, all 13 were rebuilt by A Goninan & Co with cab extensions (the stock GE cab was replaced with the standard Queensland Rail "maxicab"). They were then placed in service on the Mount Isa line.

All were withdrawn in 2011 and in May 2012 exported to South Africa with seven going to African Rail & Traction Services and six to RRL Grindrod.

References

Co-Co locomotives
Diesel locomotives of Queensland
Queensland Rail locomotives
Railway locomotives introduced in 1983
Diesel-electric locomotives of Australia
General Electric locomotives
3 ft 6 in gauge locomotives of Australia